Flashing Blades is a role-playing game published by Fantasy Games Unlimited in 1984.

Description
Flashing Blades is a 17th-century swashbuckling system. PCs choose a character class (soldier, gentleman, rogue. etc.) and assign skill points to create characters. Gain and loss of social status is important. The "Rogues, Gentlemen, Soldiers and Noblemen" book (48 pages) covers character creation, combat, and campaigns; a second book (16 pages) includes three miniscenarios. The game includes a GM's screen.

Publication history
Flashing Blades was designed by Mark Pettigrew, and was published in 1984 by Fantasy Games Unlimited as a boxed set with a 48-page book, a 16-page book, a cardstock screen, and dice.

In 1985, William H. Keith, Jr. and J. Andrew Keith expanded into Fantasy Games Unlimited's game lines including Flashing Blades.

Reviews
Different Worlds #43
Adventurer #2 (June/July, 1986)
Jeux & Stratégie #40 (as "Les trois Mousquetaires")

References

Fantasy Games Unlimited games
Historical role-playing games
Historical Swashbuckler role-playing games
Role-playing games introduced in 1984